Peter B. Champagne (December 6, 1845 – July 1, 1891) was an American businessman and politician.

Born Pierre Beaugrand dit Champagne in Saint-Félix-de-Valois, Quebec, son of Narcisse Beaugrand dit Champagne and Émilie Contré, Champagne settled in Wisconsin Rapids, Wisconsin, in 1863 and was in the logging business. In 1880, Champagne helped start a saw mill at Grandfather Falls and also started a mercantile store in Wausau, Wisconsin. In 1880, Champagne moved to Jenny Bull Falls, Wisconsin, and opened a store. He founded a railway and a lumber business. He served on the Lincoln County, Wisconsin, Board of Supervisors. He served as village president and then on the common council when Jenny Bulls Falls became a city. In 1883, Champaign served in the Wisconsin State Assembly and was a Republican. He died in Merrill, Wisconsin.

Notes

1845 births
1891 deaths
Pre-Confederation Canadian emigrants to the United States
People from Wisconsin Rapids, Wisconsin
Businesspeople from Wisconsin
County supervisors in Wisconsin
Wisconsin city council members
Mayors of places in Wisconsin
Republican Party members of the Wisconsin State Assembly
19th-century American politicians
People from Merrill, Wisconsin
19th-century American businesspeople